Anderson Hall may refer to:

Turkey
 Anderson Hall at Boğaziçi University in İstanbul

United States

 Anderson Hall (Gainesville, Florida)
Anderson Hall (Manhattan, Kansas), administration building of Kansas State University, listed on the NRHP 
 Anderson Hall (Lexington, Kentucky)
Anderson Hall (Philadelphia, Pennsylvania)
Anderson Hall (West Chester, Pennsylvania)
Artelia Anderson Hall, Paducah, Kentucky, listed on the NRHP in Kentucky
Anderson Hall (Maryville College), Tennessee, listed on the NRHP
L. C. Anderson Hall, Prairie View, Texas, listed on the NRHP in Texas

Architectural disambiguation pages